Aziory is the name of several localities in Belarus. The word literally means "lakes".

, an agrotown in Grodno Region
, a village in Vitebsk Region
, a village in Mogilev Region
, a village in Mogilev Region
, a nature preserve in Grodno Region

Populated places in Belarus